Johann Otto Hoch (also known as The Bluebeard Murderer and Chicago Bluebeard) (1855 – February 23, 1906) is the most famous and last-used alias of a German-born murderer and bigamist, John Schmidt. He was found guilty of the murder of one wife but is thought to have killed more, perhaps up to 50 victims. He was hanged.

Early life
Hoch was born John Schmidt in 1855, at Horrweiler, in the Grand Duchy of Hesse (present-day Rhineland-Palatinate, Germany). He emigrated to the United States in the 1890s and dropped his surname in favor of assorted pseudonyms where he began to marry a string of women, frequently taking the name of his most recent victim. Hoch used matrimonial ads to find victims. He would swindle all their money and either leave them or kill them with arsenic and then begin his pattern all over again. 

Chicago police would dub him "America’s greatest mass murderer", but statistics remain vague in this puzzling case. We know that Hoch bigamously married at least 55 women between 1890 and 1905, bilking all of them for cash and slaying many, but the final number of murder victims is a matter of conjecture. 

Sensational reports credit Hoch with 25 to 50 murders, but police were only certain of 15, and in the end he went to trial (and to the gallows) for a single homicide. Hoch's first and only legal wife was Christine Ramb, who bore him three children before he deserted her in 1887.

Timeline of swindles/killings

A turn of the century account partially reports on many of Hoch's victims, except where noted:
1881, Austria – marries Annie Hock {alleged}
1883, New York – Hoch arrives with wife Annie, an invalid who dies several years later {alleged}
1888, New York – After arriving from Wurtemberg, Hoch said to have married an immigrant servant girl who "died" prior to two months passing {alleged}. At the time of his 1905 New York arrest it was also alleged Hoch had married and either left/killed women in Vienna, Austria; London, England and Paris, France.
1892 Chicago – Mrs. Hoyle Hoch died {alleged}
1892, Chicago – May: Hoch under name C.A. Meyer rents flat and has a new wife {wife reportedly died after three weeks} alleged
1892, Chicago – June: Hoch under name H. Irick rents flat and has a new wife {wife reportedly died a month later} alleged
1893, Milwaukee – Hoch under name "Dr. James" marries Lena Schmitz-who died {alleged}
1893 Milwaukee – Hoch marries Lena Schmitz sister Clara {died} {Alleged}
1894 Chicago – Under a new alias Hoch rents flat with a new wife {wife reportedly died after two months} alleged
1895 Chicago – arrested under alias "C.A. Calford" and charged by Mrs. Janet Spencer with having eloped; married and deserted her with a few hundred dollars of her money; he is identified as abductor of a Hulda Stevans and a participant in a diamond robbery {alleged}
1895 April: Under the name Jacob Huff, Hoch marries Karoline/Caroline (Miller) Hoch, widow, Wheeling, WV. She died June 15, 1895. He faked his death, took her surname Hoch and went to Chicago.
1895 July 5: Arrives in Chicago
1895, July 15: Buys a saloon in Chicago
1895, August 5: A.k.a. Jacob Hoch he marries Mrs. Maria Steimbucher of Chicago-she died four months later; Hoch sold property for $4,000. Before dying she makes declaration that she has been poisoned but no notice is taken of her statement.
1895 November: Hoch marries Mary Rankin of Chicago; Hoch disappeared with her money the next day. {It is also alleged that about 1895 Hoch a.k.a. Schmidt went back to Germany but fled from a warrant charging that he was not only bankrupt but also owed 3,000 Marks}
1896 April: Hoch a.k.a. "Jacob Erdorf" marries Maria Hartzfield of Chicago; Hoch disappeared with $600 of her money after four months.
1896 September 22: Hoch a.k.a. "Schmitt" marries widow Barbara Brossett of San Francisco. "Schmitt" disappeared 2 days later with $1,465 of her money; she is so affected by the losses, she dies afterward.
1896: Hoch proposes to landlady Mrs H. Tannert of San Francisco, who refuses him.
1896 November: Hoch marries Clara Bartel of Cincinnati Ohio; she dies three months later.
1896: A Mrs. Henry Bartel dies in Baltimore {Bartel being a Hoch alias. It is also alleged that Hoch married two other times in Baltimore: a Mrs. Nannie Klenke-Schultz; Mrs. Henrietts Brooks-Schultz; an unnamed Boston woman married to a "Louis/Charles Bartels" came to Baltimore and seized his furniture}
1897 January: Marries Julia Dose of Hamilton Ohio-in Cincinnati; Hoch disappears same day with $700 of her money.
1897 July 20 – Hoch a.k.a. "Henry F. Hartman" marries in Cincinnati {alleged}
1897 December 6 – Hoch marries a woman in Williamsburg New York and disappears with $200 {alleged}
1898 January 16 – Hoch a.k.a. "William Frederick Bessing" marries Mrs. Winnie Westphal in Jersey City-Hoch disappears with $900.00 {alleged}
1898 Buffalo – New York – a Mrs. Wilhelmina Hoch died {alleged}
1898 March – Chicago Hoch appears a.k.a. "Martiz Dotz" with a wife who died June 1898 {alleged}.
1898 June: Hoch a.k.a. Adolf Hoch a.k.a. Martin Dose arrested Chicago for selling already mortgaged furniture; gets one year in jail.
1899  Milwaukee: Hoch marries an unnamed sister of Mrs J.H. Schwartz-Marue; bride dies and Hoch disappears with $1,200 {alleged}
1899  Norfolk, Va – A Mrs Hoch died suddenly {alleged}
1900: Claimed to married a Mary Hendrickson
1900: Allegedly Hoch a.k.a. "Albert Buschberg" married Mary Schultz of Argos, Indiana; Schultz, her 15-year-old daughter Nettie and $2,000 "disappeared".
1900, A "Jacob Hoch" married Anna Scheffries of Chicago (LDS record).
1900, December 12 – Hoch a.k.a. "John Healy" marries Amelia Hohn of Chicago; deserts her after getting $100.
1901, January: Hoch a.k.a. "Carl Schmidt" marries in Columbus, Ohio; after two weeks he deserts her-along with $400.
1901: Hoch marries Mrs. Loughken-Hoch in San Francisco; she dies "suddenly"
1901, November: Hoch marries Anna Goehrke; he deserts her.
1902, April 8 – marries Mrs Mary Becker of St Louis; she dies in 1903
1902 May – Hoch a.k.a. "Count Otto van Kern" marries Mrs Hulda Nagel; husband persuaded wife to convert real estate into cash; while wife is shopping, her trunk containing $3,000 is robbed on contents and "Kern" deserts wife
1903 June 18 – Hoch a.k.a. "Dr. G.L.Hart" flees after trying to poison Mabel Leichmann-a bride of three days; Hoch flees with $300 worth of diamonds and $200 of her money {alleged}
1903 Dayton Ohio – Hoch marries Mrs Annie Dodd {deserts her}
1903 Dayton Ohio – Hoch marries Mrs Regina Miller Curtis (deserts her)
1903 Milwaukee – Hoch courts Ida Zazuil but leaves her after a quarrel
1903 December – Hoch uses marriage license for Zazuil engagement and marries Mrs. T.O'Conner of Milwaukee-deserts her and absconds with $200 of her money {Alleged}
1904 January 2: A.k.a. "John Jacob Adolf Schmidt" marries Mrs Anna Hendrickson of Chicago in Hammond Indiana, and disappears January 20 with $500 of her money.
1904 June: Hoch marries Lena Hoch of Milwaukee; she dies three weeks later leaving Hoch $1,500.
1904 October 8: Hoch alias "Leo Prager" marries Bertha Dolder of Chicago-he disappears after buying $1,200 of rugs from $3,500 she gives him for a furniture store.
1904 October 20: Hoch alias "John Schmidt" marries Caroline Streicher of Philadelphia-he disappears October 31, 1904.
1904 November 9: Hoch appears in Chicago.
1904 November 16: Hoch alias "Joseph Hoch" leases a cottage in Chicago from a bank from November 16, 1904 to January 1, 1905; buys $120 worth of furniture.
1904 December 10: Marries Marie Walcker of Chicago-who sells her candy store for $75.00 and gives Hoch her life savings of $350.
1904 December 20: Marie Walcker becomes ill.
1905 January 12: Marie Walcker-Hoch dies.
1905 January 15: Hoch marries Marie's sister Mrs. Fischer in Joliet Ill, who gives Hoch $750 [$500{?}; Hoch leaves after Mrs. Fischer sister denounces Hoch as a murderer and swindler. Note Hoch married Fischer under the alias of John "Hock"; he is also alleged to have married; swindled and desertered Anna Frederickson in 1904
1905 January 30: Hoch alias "Harry Bartells" proposes to his landlady Mrs. Catherine Kimmerle of New York City; she refuses and Hoch is arrested; Hoch claims alias of "John Joseph Adolf Hoch."
1905 February 1: Two indictments returned against Hoch for bigamy; alleged number of wives to be twenty-nine.
1905 February 5: Five more alleged wives of Hoch identify him
1905 May 19: Hoch tried and found guilty of murder of Marie Walcker; sentenced to death June 23, 1905.
1905 June 23: Cora Wilson of Chicago advances money so Hoch can appeal sentence to Illinois Supreme Court, which sustains lower court and sets execution date for August 25, 1905.
1905 August 25 – Hoch execution put off until October session of Illinois Supreme Court.
1905 December 16 – Illinois Supreme Court refuses to intervene.
1906 February 23 – Hoch is executed in Chicago. After his execution, several cemeteries refused him burial so Hoch was taken to the Cook County (Illinois) Farm at Dunning (Chicago). This is the long forgotten Cook County Cemetery on the grounds of the Cook County Poor Farm at Dunning later to become Chicago State Hospital, and then became Chicago Read Zone. A portion of the cemetery has been preserved as the Read Zone-Dunning Memorial Park on Chicago's Northwest side.
He was moved to Elmwood Cemetery in River Grove.

Other reported victims
In addition to the above, it is alleged that Hoch was involved with a Mrs. John Hicks of Wheeling WV {died}; Mrs. Emma Rencke of Chicago; Mrs. Palinka of Batavia Ill; a Mrs. Fink of Aurora; Natalie Irgang; Hulda Stevens; Schwatzman of Milwaukee; and a Justina Loeffler of Elkhart Indiana who "disappeared" in Chicago in 1903.; a Mrs. Lena Hoch died in Milwaukee in 1897; a Mrs. Hoch died 1897 and a Mrs. Hoch died 1898 – both sisters of Mrs. J.H.H. Schwartman of Milwaukee.
Allegedly Hoch married twice in Cincinnati, Ohio under alias of "Henry Bartel" and "Fred Doess".

See also 
 List of serial killers in the United States

References

1855 births
1906 deaths
20th-century executions by Illinois
20th-century executions of American people
American confidence tricksters
Date of birth unknown
Executed people from Rhineland-Palatinate
German emigrants to the United States
German people convicted of murder
German people executed abroad
People convicted of murder by Illinois
People executed by Illinois by hanging
People from Mainz-Bingen
People from Rhenish Hesse
Poisoners
Suspected serial killers
Uxoricides